Ursula Benedix (12 September 1922 – 17 May 2014) was a German politician of the Christian Democratic Union (CDU) and former member of the German Bundestag.

Life 
Benedix joined the CDU in 1953 and was a member of the party's district and regional executive committee. On 5 May 1967, she moved for the first time into the state parliament of Lower Saxony, to which she belonged in the sixth and seventh legislative periods from 5 May 1967 to 24 January 1973. There she was spokesperson for cultural policy and also a member of the parliamentary party council. On 24 January 1973 she left the state parliament because she had been elected to the German Bundestag in the previous year's federal election via the state list of Lower Saxony. She was a member of the German Bundestag for a total of three election periods, from the seventh to the ninth; she was elected via the state list of Lower Saxony in each case. She was a member of the Committee for Education and Science in all three terms, in the ninth even as deputy chairperson of this committee.

Literature

References

1922 births
2014 deaths
Members of the Bundestag for Lower Saxony
Members of the Bundestag 1980–1983
Members of the Bundestag 1976–1980
Members of the Bundestag 1972–1976
Female members of the Bundestag
20th-century German women politicians
Members of the Bundestag for the Christian Democratic Union of Germany
Members of the Landtag of Lower Saxony